Delia Casanova (born Delia Margarita Casanova Mendiola on November 4, 1948, in Poza Rica, Veracruz, Mexico) is a Mexican actress.

Filmography

Awards and nominations

References

External links

1948 births
Living people
Mexican telenovela actresses
Mexican television actresses
Mexican film actresses
Mexican stage actresses
Ariel Award winners
Actresses from Veracruz
20th-century Mexican actresses
21st-century Mexican actresses
People from Poza Rica